Infundibulum concavum is a species of sea snail, a marine gastropod mollusk in the family Trochidae, the top snails.

Description
The height of the shell varies between 35 mm and 40 mm, its diameter between 45 mm and 47 mm. The false-umbilicate shell has a regularly conic shape. It is concave below. Its color is greenish and roseus, under a dull grayish-green cuticle. The outlines of the spire is nearly rectilinear. The 7 to 8 whorls are planulate, very obliquely striate, radiately corrugated, and covered with a very minute secondary sculpture of radiating, fine, close wrinkles. The body whorl is acutely carinated at the periphery. The base of the shell is concave, concentrically lirate, the lirae about 6 to 8 in number, granose in the young, nearlysmooth in the adult. The aperture is very oblique, covering half the base. The outer lip is very prosocline and crenulated by the folds of the outside. The basal margin is straight, thin, and simple. The columella is oblique, with a strong fold above, projecting into the aperture with a very deep  insertion. The parietal wall is lirate. The umbilical tract is white or yellowish, spirally costate in young, smooth in fully adult specimens.

This is a very distinct form, with an aperture so oblique as to resemble a Calyptraea Lamarck, 1799

Distribution
This species occurs in the Indian Ocean off Madagascar and off the Mascarene Basin.

References

External links
 

concavum
Gastropods described in 1791
Taxa named by Johann Friedrich Gmelin